The European College of Neuropsychopharmacology (ECNP) is a pan-European, non-profit scientific association that serves as a platform to exchange and promote research in the field of neuropsychopharmacology. The ECNP “is committed to ensuring that advances in the understanding of brain function and human behaviour are translated into better treatments and enhanced public health”. The ECNP organises a number of activities to achieve this aim, such as a yearly congress, workshops, seminars, New Frontiers Meetings, publications, awards, supported talks and much more.

History 

In 1984 representatives of neuropsychopharmacological societies from across Europe suggested there might be room for a European structure. A meeting to discuss this plan further was held in Copenhagen in May 1985. It was decided that a European College of Neuropsychopharmacology would be founded. A Working Group was formed to plan of the association’s inaugural scientific congress. This congress was held in Brussels in 1987. Around 500 people attended.
The Working Group consisted of:

Carlos Ballús, Spain 
Per Bech, Denmark 
Giovanni Cassano, Italy 
Alexandra Delini-Stula, Switzerland 
Markus Gastpar, Switzerland 
Carl-Gerhard Gottfries, Sweden 
Lars F. Gram, Denmark 
Max Hamilton, United Kingdom
Paul Kielholz, Switzerland 
Julien Mendlewicz, Belgium 
Giorgio Racagni, Italy 
Eckart Ruther, Germany 
Michael Trimble, United Kingdom
Willem Verhoeven, Netherlands 
Jennifer Wakelin, Netherlands 
Édouard Zarifian, France

In 1993 the College established a permanent secretariat in Utrecht, Netherlands.

Organization 

The ECNP’s executive organ is the Executive Committee. The Executive Committee consists of six officers (the president, vice- president, president-elect, past-president, secretary and treasurer) and a maximum of six councillors. The Executive Committee has a three year term.

The 2019-2022 Executive Committee consists of:

Martien Kas, The Netherlands, President 
Gitte Moos Knudsen, Denmark, Past-President  
Andreas Reif, Germany, President-Elect 
Elisabeth Binder, Germany, Vice-President 
Catherine Harmer, United Kingdom, treasurer 
Suzanne Dickson, Sweden, Secretary

Councillors 
David Baldwin, United Kingdom 
Paolo Brambilla, Italy 
Iria Grande, Spain
Iiris Hovatta, Finland 
Marin Jukic, Sweden 
Marion Leboyer, France

Chair Scientific Programme Committee
John Cryan, Ireland

Editor-in-chief European Neuropsychopharmacology ENP
Eduard Vieta, Spain

Editor-in-chief Neuroscience Applied
Andreas Meyer-Lindenberg, Germany

Executive Director 
Alexander Schubert, The Netherlands

Past presidents are:

Gitte Moos Knudsen, Denmark (2019-2022)
Celso Arango, Spain (2016-2019)
Guy Goodwin, United Kingdom (2013-2016)
Joseph Zohar, Israel (2010-2013)
David Nutt, United Kingdom (2007-2010)
Julien Mendlewicz, Belgium (2004-2007)
Yves Lecrubier, France (2002-2004)
Jan M. van Ree, Netherlands (1998-2002)
Manfred Ackenheil, Germany (1995-1998)
Stuart A. Montgomery, United Kingdom (1992-1995)
Salomon Z. Langer, France (1989-1992)
Carl-Gerhard Gottfries, Sweden (1987-1989)

The Executive Committee oversees the work of various sub-committees of the Executive Committees. These committees are staffed by scientists working in the field of neuropsychopharmacology.

Abstract and Poster Committee

The Abstract and Poster Committee oversees the abstract and poster process of the ECNP Congress.

Award Committee

The Award Committee reviews applications for the ECNP Neuropsychopharmacology Award. The terms and criteria for this award, however, are set by the Executive Committee.

Early Career Advisory Panel (ECAP)

Six years ago ECNP founded the Early Career Advisory Panel (ECAP) to advise on the needs of future members of the College, to give input on development of Early Career Scientist activities and initiatives, to help generate activities for Early Career Scientists and clinicians, and to receive feedback on current activities.

Educational Committee

The Educational Committee is charged with propagating best practices in European applied neuroscience, from research methods and to clinical standards. As such, it oversees ECNP’s training activities and educational programmes, especially for early career scientists.

Networks Board and Taskforce

Each ECNP Network is led by a Chair and a Co-chair. Chairs and Co-chairs of Networks and thematic working groups (TWGs) form the Networks Taskforce, which reports to the Networks Board and meets twice a year. The Networks Board guides the ECNP Networks.

New Frontiers Programme Committee

The committee is responsible for developing the programme of the New Frontiers Meeting, held annually in Nice, France, and for guiding the ongoing discussion the meeting is designed to stimulate.

Workshop Committee

The Workshop Committee is charged with the organisation of the ECNP Workshop on Neuropsychopharmacology for Early Career Scientists in Europe, held annually in Nice, France.

Committees independent from the Executive committee 
External Review Board of the ECNP  

The External Review Board of the ECNP (formerly known as the Scientific Committee) was established in 2007 with the broad aim of overseeing the quality assurance of ECNP’s governance and that of its activities.
Nominating Committee

The Nominating Committee nominates candidates for the future Executive Committee (EC).

Scientific Advisory Panel

The Scientific Advisory Panel (SAP) is ECNP’s scientific sounding board, providing guidance and content advice in ECNP’s key areas of scientific focus in disorders, interventions and methods.

Scientific Programme Committee (ECNP Congress)

The chair of the Scientific Programme Committee (SPC) is appointed by the Executive Committee for three consecutive ECNP Congresses. For each congress, the chair SPC submits a proposal of committee members to the Executive Committee for approval, taking into account scientific standing of potential candidates, as well as the overall geographical and disciplinary balance. The independent SPC is charged with ensuring that the programme is of a uniformly high standard and balanced across the field of applied and translational neuroscience.

Activities 

 ECNP Congress
 The ECNP Congress is an annual meeting on applied neuroscience and mental disorders. The meeting is intended for medical researchers in neuropsychopharmacology, psychiatry and neurology, clinicians and practitioners, neuroscientists, and public health professionals. 
ECNP Workshop
The ECNP organizes an annual three-day workshop for 100 early career scientists in Europe. 
ECNP Workshop on Clinical Research Methods

This Workshop aims at introducing early career clinicians (psychiatrists, clinical psychologists, etc) into research methodology and to promote a critical thinking approach to the scientific literature that is particularly relevant to clinical practice.

ECNP New Frontiers Meeting
This meeting is an essential platform for focused, high-level exchange at the intersection of research science and the development of psychedelics as new treatments for brain disorders.
ECNP Seminar
 The ECNP Seminars are two-day meetings, held in different European countries, focused on research training for junior psychiatrists who have limited access to international meetings.

Awards 
ECNP Negative Results Prize in Clinical Neuroscience

The ECNP Negative Results Prize in Clinical Neuroscience recognises those who have made exceptional contributions to CNS treatment development by publishing clinical research with negative findings.

Best Negative Data Prize

The Best Negative Data Prize is a collaboration between ECNP and U.S.-based non-profit research organisation Cohen Veterans Bioscience to recognise published “negative” scientific results or results of studies that do not confirm the expected outcome or original hypothesis.

ECNP Citation Prize

The ECNP Citation Prize recognises and encourage impactful original research in the ECNP journal, European Neuropsychopharmacology (ENP). It is awarded to the most cited research paper in the preceding two years.

ECNP Neuropsychopharmacology Award

The ECNP Neuropsychopharmacology Award recognises exceptional research achievements in applied and translational neuroscience.

ECNP Poster Award

Outstanding posters presented at the congress are awarded the ECNP Poster Award.

ECNP Public Choice Poster Award

The best poster presented at the congress that is chosen by the public is awarded the ECNP Public Choice Poster Award.

ECNP Seminar Award

ECNP confers two awards during each ECNP Seminar to help and encourage the most promising ECNP Seminar participants to visit the upcoming ECNP Congress.

ECNP Excellence Award

The ECNP Excellence Award was established to encourage Early Career Scientists (ECS) resident in Europe and/or residents of a European Country with a Developing Country (CDE) to present a poster during the annual ECNP Congress.

ECNP Rising Star Award

The ECNP Rising Star Award honours an Early Career Scientist whose research in applied and translational neuroscience has the potential to advance the science and treatment and prevention of brain disorders.

Publications 

The ECNP publishes:

 European Neuropsychopharmacology, which is a monthly peer-reviewed scientific journal. Eduard Vieta is the Editor-in-chief.
 Neuroscience Applied, a fully open-access scientific journal, targeting the intersection between neuroscience, applications and new treatment horizons. Andreas Meyer-Lindenberg is the Editor-in-chief.

Partners 

Alliance for Biomedical Research in Europe

Alliance for Biomedical Research
European Brain Council (EBC) (founder member)
Federation of European Neuroscience Societies (FENS) (founder member)
International Society for CNS Clinical Trials and Methodology (ISCTM)

References

External links 
Official website
European Neuropsychopharmacology
35th ECNP Congress 2022
36th ECNP Congress 2023
37th ECNP Congress 2024

Psychiatric research institutes
Pharmacological societies
Neuroscience organizations
Brain disorders
Mental health
Mental disorders